The Queen's Nursing Institute (QNI) is a charity that works to improve the nursing care of people in their own homes in England, Wales, and Northern Ireland. It does not operate in Scotland, where the Queen's Nursing Institute Scotland performs a similar function. 
The QNI is also affiliated to the Queen's Institute of District Nursing in Ireland. The QNI is a member of the International Council of Nurses.

History
In 1859, Liverpool merchant and philanthropist William Rathbone employed a nurse named Mary Robinson to care for his wife at home during her final illness. After his wife's death, Rathbone decided to employ Robinson to nurse people in their own homes who could not afford medical care. The success of this early experiment encouraged him to campaign for more nurses to be employed in the community.

Elizabeth Malleson was concerned to find that there was little local service of nurses for pregnant women in the 1880s. Malleson arranged for a trained nurse and midwife to be available to serve the people of Gotherington. Malleson's scheme was not the first but she decided to form a national organisation and her appeal for help brought her into contact with Lady Lucy Hicks-Beech. She was the wife of Michael Hicks Beach, 1st Earl St Aldwyn, and they gathered enough support to launch a Rural Nursing Association. This was despite the opposition of Florence Nightingale.

These were the beginning of organised district nursing. By the end of the 19th century, with the approval of Queen Victoria, the movement became a national voluntary organisation responsible for setting standards and training nurses. In 1887 'the women of England' raised a Jubilee Fund of £70,000 to mark Victoria's Golden Jubilee. The Queen announced that the money should be used for nursing, and Queen Victoria's Jubilee Institute for Nurses was chartered in 1889. Elizabeth Malleson's nurses became the Rural Nursing Division in 1891 was Malleson was its secretary. Rosalind Paget was the main organisation's first superintendent, and later inspector-general. Queen Alexandra agreed to be a patron in 1901, and a Queen has been patron of the charity ever since. From 1928 the institute was known as The Queen's Institute of District Nursing until it assumed its present name in 1973.

Campaigns
One in four people over the age of 75 in the United Kingdom need a district nurse's care at home, rising to 1 in 2 people over the age of 85. District nurses visit more than 2.6 million people a year (c. 2011) but by that time the number of trained district nurses had fallen to fewer than 10,000 in England and has continued to decline ever since (QNI, 2022). The number of health care assistants - trained to do specific tasks but not educated or registered as nurses - had more than doubled. It was against this background that The Queen's Nursing Institute launched the 'Right Nurse, Right Skills' campaign.

Queen's Nurses

The title ‘Queen’s Nurse’ was first given to district nurses who had trained with the Queen's Nursing Institute and undertaken its written examination. The institute continued to award this qualification until 1968, when nurse education was taken into higher education and the title fell into abeyance. The QNI re-instated the title of Queen's Nurse in 2007 after a gap of 40 years with the approval of the charity's patron, the Queen. The modern Queen's Nurse title is not a qualification, but it is awarded following a rigorous anonymous assessment process, requiring applicants to submit details of their professional career, essays in reflective practice, and references from patients, managers and colleagues. It is available to all nurses who have worked in community settings for over five years and is not restricted to district nurses. In 2021, there are around 1700 Queen's Nurses in England, Wales and Northern Ireland. The Queen's Nursing Institute Scotland has also reintroduced the title of Queen's Nurse in a different form, using its own assessment criteria.

Programmes and services

Leadership Development
The charity has a growing range of opportunities for senior nurses working in the community who wish to progress personally and professionally. https://qni.org.uk/explore-qni/leadership-programmes/

Standards for Specialist Practitioner Qualifications
The QNI has an impressive track record of developing voluntary standards of education and practice for community nursing specialisms. This area of work is expanding in 2022 following the review by the Nursing and Midwifery Council of specialist practice. Information about new SPQ standards undertaken by the QNI will be made available on its website. https://qni.org.uk/nursing-in-the-community/standards/

Personal support
The charity provides grants to nurses in financial need, and educational grants to support nurses taking accredited community nursing courses. In 2020, during the COVID-19 pandemic, the QNI launched TalkToUs, a confidential listening service for community nurses to be able to speak to someone about work or personal challenges. The QNI also has a programme called Keep in Touch, that puts working and retired Queen's Nurses together for regular phone contact.

Community Nursing Innovation Programme
Since 1990 The Queen's Nursing Institute has supported hundreds of nurse-led projects through its Fund for Innovation. Dissemination of project results also helps nurses in other areas to learn from and implement new ideas. The projects—led by community nurses, midwives or health visitors—set up new services or improved ways of working. Grants of up to £5000 are available, in addition to a full year of professional development and support. All project leaders benefit from a professional development programme.

Homeless and Inclusion Health Programme
The QNI launched the Homeless Health Programme in 2007, piloted with funding from the Big Lottery Fund until 2010, to offer support to all community nurses, health visitors, midwives and other health professionals working with individuals and families without a secure home. This initiative established a national network of homeless health professionals, offering training events, specialist publications and other support.
The network has continued to grow and develop since its launch, and seeks to share knowledge and share practice for professionals who work with a wide range of people who may typically experience barriers to accessing health services, for example Gypsy, Roma and Traveller communities.

Policy
Healthcare policy is a key activity for The Queen's Nursing Institute. The QNI works to influence decision-makers across England, Wales and Northern Ireland on health care policy including primary care, public health, nursing education, regulation and skill mix and issues such as services for homeless people and reducing health inequalities. To do so, The QNI contributes to stakeholder meetings, responds to national consultations, takes up issues raised by local projects where it appears they may have wider significance, and provides examples and information to policy-makers.

Publications
In 2009 QNI published an influential report ‘2020 Vision – focusing on the future of district nursing’ that set out a clear and focused look at what modern district nursing is and does.

In it, the QNI shared a vision of a future when “many more people are treated at home, technology is exploited to the full to help deliver care and maintain independence, and the relationship between the individual, their family or carers and the nurse is key to building the trust and confidence people need to remain at home as long as possible”. The report outlined recommendations for the practice, education, training and management of community nursing in the future. An updated report was published in 2014 and this has been the inspiration for subsequent reports on district nursing and other community specialisms, including general practice nursing, new technology in community nursing, and inclusion healthcare.

In 2019, the QNI alongside the Royal College of Nursing published a new report, Outstanding Models of District Nursing, that highlighted the fall in the number of full time equivalent qualified district nurses which is shown in national workforce statistics.

International Community Nursing Observatory

In November 2019, the charity launched the International Community Nursing Observatory (ICNO) to further its research and data gathering objectives, particularly around evidence for the community nursing workforce in the UK. https://www.qni.org.uk/explore-qni/icno/

Awards

The charity makes a number of awards to individual community nurses each year and these are traditionally presented at the Awards Ceremony. The criteria for each award are available on the charity's website; some are open to individual applications while others require nomination by colleagues.

The Queen Elizabeth the Queen Mother Award for Outstanding Service
Founded in 1994, this award is presented to nurses who have given exceptional service to patients through nursing practice in any aspect of community or primary health care.

The QNI Long Service Award
This award is given to nurses who have worked for 21 years or more in the community.

The Philip Goodeve-Docker Memorial Prize
This prize is presented to an outstanding student at each university offering the District Nursing Specialist Practitioner Qualification programme. The prize is named in memory of a young man who died while raising funds for the charity, on an expedition to cross the Greenland ice sheet.

The Dora Rylance Memorial Prize
A prize for outstanding students of Health Visiting SCHPN programmes.

The Mary Ellen Memorial Prize
A prize for outstanding students of General Practice Nursing Specialist Practitioner Qualification programmes.

The International Community Nurse of the Year Award
An award created in 2021 for internationally educated nurses who are now working in England.

Branding
In February 2011 The Queen's Nursing Institute rebranded the organisation. As part of this process it re-emphasized its mission to focus on protecting and improving the standards of nursing care at home. The old logo, in use for more than 120 years, is still used in certain circumstances.

Funding
The QNI's main sources of funding are from grant-making organisations, donations and investment income. The QNI is not part of the NHS, and receives no regular Government funding. The QNI's most important financial contributor on an annual basis is the National Garden Scheme, which was created by the QNI and which has supported the charity since 1927.

See also
Victorian Order of Nurses, Canada

References

External links

 Queen's Nursing Institute official site
 Nursing Heritage website

  Subject guide for Nursing, Midwifery and Health Visiting from the Wellcome Library
 Nurse First official website
 National Gardens Scheme official website

1887 establishments in England
Health in the City of Westminster
Nursing organisations in the United Kingdom
Organisations based in the City of Westminster
Organizations established in 1887
Community nursing